Guilty or The Guilty may refer to:

 Guilt (emotion), an experience that occurs when a person believes they have violated a moral standard

Law
Culpability, the degree to which an agent can be held responsible for action or inaction
Guilt (law), a finding of legal culpability
Guilty plea, a formal admission of legal culpability

Film
Guilty (1916 film), a silent drama starring Harry Carey
Guilty (1922 film), a silent Western by Ranger Bill Miller
Guilty (1928 film), a German silent film
Guilty? (1930 film), a film directed by George B. Seitz
The Guilty (1947 film), an American film noir
Guilty? (1951 film), a French film directed by Yvan Noé
Guilty (1953 film), an Iranian film
The Guilty (2000 film), an American crime film starring Bill Pullman
Guilty (2009 film), a film featuring John Hambrick
Guilty (2011 film), a French film
Guilty (2015 film) or Talvar, an Indian film
The Guilty (2018 film), a Danish film
The Guilty (2021 film), an American remake of the Danish film
Guilty (2020 film), an Indian Netflix feature film

Publications
The Guilty (Baldacci novel), a 2015 novel by David Baldacci
The Guilty (novel series), a 2002 Japanese light novel series
Guilty: Liberal "Victims" and Their Assault on America, a 2009 book by Ann Coulter
Guilty (Le Coupable), a 1944 book by Georges Bataille
 Guilty (manga), a 2017 Japanese manga series by Ai Okaue

Music

Albums
Guilty! (album), by Eric Burdon and Jimmy Witherspoon, 1971
Guilty (Ayumi Hamasaki album) or the title song, 2008
Guilty (Barbra Streisand album) or the title song (see below), 1980
The Guilty Demos, an album containing the demos made by Barry Gibb for Streisand's album, 2006
Guilty (Blue album) or the title song (see below), 2003
Guilty (Glay album), 2013
Guilty (Hugh Cornwell album), 1997
Guilty (Straight Faced album) or the title song, 1995
Guilty: 30 Years of Randy Newman, a box set or its 1974 title song (see below), 1998
Guilty, by The Vibrators, 1982

EPs
Guilty (Octavia Sperati EP), 2002
Guilty, by Oi Polloi, 1993
Guilty, by Unsraw, 2010

Songs
"Guilty" (All song), 1994
"Guilty" (Barbra Streisand and Barry Gibb song), 1980
"Guilty" (Blue song), 2003
"Guilty" (Gravity Kills song), 1996
"Guilty" (Mike Oldfield instrumental), 1979
"Guilty" (PJ Harvey song), 2016
"Guilty" (The Pearls song), 1974
"Guilty" (The Rasmus song), 2004
"Guilty" (Richard Whiting, Harry Akst and Gus Kahn song), 1931; popularised by Margaret Whiting (1946) and by Johnny Desmond (1946)
"Guilty" (Since October song), 2009
"Guilty" (The Statler Brothers song), 1983
"Guilty" (The Warren Brothers song), 1998
"Guilty", by Alice Cooper from Alice Cooper Goes to Hell, 1976
"Guilty", by De Souza feat. Shèna, 2007
"Guilty", by Jim Reeves, 1963
"Guilty", by the Kinks from Word of Mouth, 1984
"Guilty", by Lime, 1983
"Guilty", by Marina and the Diamonds from The Family Jewels, 2010
"Guilty", by Paloma Faith from The Architect, 2017
"Guilty", by Randy Newman from Good Old Boys, 1974
"Guilty", by Stone Temple Pilots from Stone Temple Pilots, 2018
"Guilty", by Usher from Raymond v. Raymond, 2010

Television

Series
Guilty! (TV series), a 1990s British mock-court comedy programme
The Guilty, a 1992 British serial featuring Lee Ross
The Guilty (TV series), a 2013 British crime drama

Episodes
"Guilty" (Arrow)
"Guilty" (Awake)
"Guilty" (Desperate Housewives)
"Guilty" (Hunter)
"Guilty" (Spider-Man)
"Guilty" (Person of Interest)

Video games
 Guilty (video game), a 1995 adventure game published by Psygnosis

See also
Guilt (disambiguation)